EuroBasket Records are the records attained during play in the EuroBasket, which is the pre-eminent pan-European international basketball tournament that is contested between national teams.

Most Valuable Players and Top Scorers

All-Tournament Teams

Head coach of winners

All-time leading scorers in total points scored
Counting all games played through the end of EuroBasket 2017, and not counting qualification games.

All-time leading scorers in points per game average
Counting all games played through the end of EuroBasket 2017, and not counting qualification games.

Most points scored in a single game
During EuroBasket 2022

° Performed in the Finals

All-time leaders in games played
Counting all games played through the end of EuroBasket 2017

Triple-doubles 
Four players have recorded a triple-double (at least 10+ in three statistical categories).

Top medalists 
 Through the end of EuroBasket 2017.
 Minimum 5 total medals, or 4 gold medals won.

See also 
 FIBA EuroBasket
 FIBA EuroBasket MVP
 FIBA EuroBasket All-Tournament Team
 FIBA EuroBasket All-Time leaders in games played
 FIBA EuroBasket All-time leading scorers in total points scored
 FIBA World Cup
 FIBA World Cup Records
 FIBA World Cup MVP
 FIBA World Cup All-Tournament Team
 FIBA's 50 Greatest Players (1991)

References

External links 
 
 

EuroBasket
Basketball statistics